Reginald Aldworth Daly (March 18, 1871 – September 19, 1957) was a Canadian geologist.

Biography
Reginald Daly was educated at the University of Toronto, where geologist A.P. Coleman persuaded him away from teaching mathematics and into Earth Sciences. He attained his PhD at Harvard, and did postgraduate work in Germany and France. After working as a field geologist for the International Boundary Commission, he was a professor, and headed the Department of Geology at Harvard University from 1912 until 1942. Daly was president of The Geological Society of America in 1932.

He documented the geology alone, but had the help of one field assistant and numerous wranglers and porters. He collected 1,500 rock specimens and made 960 thin sections, using a German polishing technique he learnt as a student. The project also included 1,300 photographs, dozens of lake soundings, stratigraphic and structural mapping, petrology, and morphology. In 1912, he filed his final report with the Geological Survey of Canada, a massive 3-volume tome he called North America Cordillera: Forty-Ninth Parallel. This work along the 49th parallel led him to formulate a theory of the origins of igneous rocks, and later publish his seminal work Igneous Rocks and Their Origin in 1914.

According to Daly's biographer, James Natland, Daly was an early proponent of Arthur Holmes' and Alfred Wegener's continental drift theory. Daly summarized his ideas in his 1926 book, Our Mobile Earth, which included on the title page small print adopted from Galileo: E pur si muove. Daly's theory on continental displacement was based partly on the idea that after the Moon was ejected from the Earth, continental movement was an inevitable part of rebalancing the planet; he also suggested that continental material accruing near oceans eventually slips, and forces continents to creep along. He expanded this notion in Strength and Structure of the Earth, in 1940, where Daly anticipated aspects of plate tectonics, including introduction of a "mesospheric shell" and a slippery vitreous basaltic substratum.

Daly also proposed the impact theory of lunar creation in 1946, which countered two prevailing notions: George Darwin's hypothesis that the Moon spun out of the primordial Earth due to centrifugal force; and, another fashionable theory that the Moon was a captured wayward asteroid. Daly applied Newtonian physics to make his point, which was later validated.

Family
In 1903, Daly married Louise Porter Haskell, daughter of Alexander Cheves Haskell and Alice Van Yeveren, and elder sister of Mary Elizabeth Haskell. After their marriage, Louise accompanied Daly on his travels, and in the field, as an assistant. She did much of the work in preparing and editing his manuscripts and books, and Daly's 1914 book on 'Igneous Rocks and their Origin' is dedicated to her; his 'inspiring fellow worker'.

Awards
In 1909, Daly was elected a member of the American Academy of Arts and Sciences. Daly was awarded the Penrose Medal in 1935, the Wollaston Medal in 1942 and the William Bowie Medal in 1946. In 1950 he became foreign member of the Royal Netherlands Academy of Arts and Sciences. The potassium zirconium silicate mineral dalyite and craters on Mars and the Moon are named in his honor. His Cambridge, Massachusetts, house (the Reginald A. Daly House) is now a National Historic Landmark.

References

Bibliography

Further reading
 
 Robert M. Hazen: Reginald Aldworth Daly (1871-1957). Daly′s Biography, American Geophysical Union
 James H. Natland: Reginald Aldworth Daly (1871–1957): Eclectic Theoretician of the Earth. GSA Today, vol. 16, no. 2, 2006
 Francis Birch: Reginald Aldworth Daly, 1871-1957, A Biographical Memoir National Academy of Sciences, Washington, DC, 36 pp., 1960

External links
 

1871 births
1957 deaths
Canadian geologists
Penrose Medal winners
Wollaston Medal winners
Harvard University faculty
People from Lennox and Addington County
Harvard University alumni
Members of the Royal Netherlands Academy of Arts and Sciences
Members of the United States National Academy of Sciences
Tectonicists
Presidents of the Geological Society of America
Fellows of the American Academy of Arts and Sciences